VIPS is a restaurant chain in South Korea owned by the CJ Foodville of CJ Group.

History

In South Korea 
The first store was opened in 1997 in Deungchon, Seoul.

As of 2015, the chain had 112 branches in South Korea. The number of stores, however, decreased sharply in the next few years.  It decreased to 61 in 2018 and 45 in December 2019.
 VIPS recognized the crisis, and attempted various changes for sales growth through changing the store concepts and interior relevant to the targets that live near the store.

In China 
In 2015 CJ Foodville announced a plan to set up some 100 restaurants in China by 2017.

References

External links
 https://www.facebook.com/ivips/
 

South Korean brands
Restaurants in South Korea
Restaurant chains in South Korea
CJ Group